Following are organizations that have in their name either "association of churches" or all of those words:

American Association of Lutheran Churches
Association of Baptist Churches of Chad
Association of Baptist Churches in Ireland
Association of Baptist Churches in Israel
Association of Evangelical Churches in Burkina Faso
Association of Evangelical Lutheran Churches
Association of Vineyard Churches
Mülheim Association of Free Churches and Evangelical Communities
National Association of Congregational Christian Churches
National Spiritualist Association of Churches
New Wineskins Association of Churches
Re-formed Association of Churches of Christ

See also
Association of churches

Religious organizations
Churches